The Wolverine Range is a small subrange of the Swannell Ranges of the Omineca Mountains, located west of Williston Lake and south of Omineca Arm in northern British Columbia, Canada.

References

Wolverine Range in the Canadian Mountain Encyclopedia

Swannell Ranges